This is a list of years in Hong Kong.

18th century

19th century

20th century

21st century

See also
 Timeline of Hong Kong history
 List of years in China

 
year
Years